Smrečje is a dispersed settlement in the hills northwest of Vrhnika in the Inner Carniola region of Slovenia. It comprises the hamlets of Celarje, Jazba, Kajndol, Samija, Spodnje Smrečje, Zgornje Smrečje, Spodnja Dolina, and Šuštarjev Graben.

Church

The local church in the settlement is dedicated to the Assumption of Mary and belongs to the Parish of Šentjošt nad Horjulom.

Gallery

References

External links

Smrečje on Geopedia

Populated places in the Municipality of Vrhnika